First Franklin may refer to: 

 The 1863 First Battle of Franklin in the American Civil War
 First Franklin Financial Corp., a mortgage lender